The Jamaica Independence Act 1962 (c. 40) is an Act of the Parliament of the United Kingdom that granted independence to Jamaica with effect from 6 August 1962.

As a result of the Act, Jamaica became the first English-speaking country in the West Indies to achieve full independence from the United Kingdom. At independence, Jamaica became a member of the Commonwealth of Nations as a Commonwealth realm; prior to this, Jamaica had been part of the West Indies Federation from 1958. With the independence of Jamaica, the Cayman Islands reverted from being a self-governing territory of Jamaica to direct British rule.

Background to enactment 
The bill was first presented in the House of Commons of the United Kingdom as the Jamaica Independence Bill on 22 May 1962, by Secretary of State for the Colonies, Reginald Maudling. It was passed in the House of Commons after a third reading and committee on 29 June 1962.
It entered the House of Lords on 2 July 1962 and was read by Michael Hicks Beach, 2nd Earl St Aldwyn on 5 July 1962. It was passed in the House of Lords on 16 July 1962 without any amendments.

The bill received Royal assent on 19 July 1962, from Queen Elizabeth II.

See also
 Commonwealth of Nations
 Monarchy of Jamaica

References 

 
 Chronological table of the statutes; HMSO, London. 1993. 

Independence acts in the Parliament of the United Kingdom
United Kingdom Acts of Parliament 1962
1962 in politics
1962 in international relations
History of Jamaica
Jamaica–United Kingdom relations
Jamaica and the Commonwealth of Nations
United Kingdom and the Commonwealth of Nations